The Saint Lucia warbler (Setophaga delicata) is a species of bird in the family Parulidae.
It is endemic to Saint Lucia. It was once considered a subspecies of the Adelaide's warbler.

References

Saint Lucia Warbler
Birds of Saint Lucia
Endemic birds of the Caribbean
Saint Lucia warbler
Taxa named by Robert Ridgway
Taxonomy articles created by Polbot